The Aegean Sea is a c. 1877 oil painting by American artist Frederic Edwin Church, and one of his last large-scale paintings.

Description
The painting measures . It is a capriccio inspired by Church's travels to Europe and the Middle East from 1867 to 1869. In the foreground are three small human figures in conversation beside a road based on an oil study of three Bedouins. The cloudy sky is enlivened by a double rainbow. 

In this work, Church moved away from his usual naturalistic style to a more idealised style.  The  atmospheric effects that may be inspired by the paintings of J. M. W. Turner which Church had seen in London (although Church had already used a double rainbow in his 1866 painting Rainy Season in the Tropics).  The work may also take inspiration from Turner's 1826 view of the Roman Forum.  Church designed a gilded frame for the painting, decorated with an eclectic mixture of Middle Eastern motifs, including stars and rosettes, and egg-and-dart and other moldings.

History
The painting was bought by the railway tycoon William H. Osborn, a close friend and supporter of Church, and bequeathed to the Metropolitan Museum of Art on the death of his wife Virginia Reed (Sturges) Osborn in 1902.

References

1877 paintings
Aegean Sea
Maritime paintings
Paintings by Frederic Edwin Church
Paintings in the collection of the Metropolitan Museum of Art
Ships in art